The World Athletics Championships (until 2019 known as the World Championships in Athletics) are a biennial athletics competition organized by World Athletics (formerly IAAF, International Association of Athletics Federations). Alongside the Olympic Games, they represent the highest level championships of senior international outdoor athletics competition for track and field athletics globally, including marathon running and race walking. Separate World Championships are held by World Athletics for certain other outdoor events, including cross-country running and half-marathon, as well as indoor and age-group championships.

The World Championships were started in 1976 in response to the International Olympic Committee dropping the men's 50 km walk from the Olympic programme for the 1976 Montreal Olympics, despite its constant presence at the games since 1932. The IAAF chose to host its own world championship event instead, a month and a half after the Olympics. It was the first World Championships that the IAAF had hosted separate from the Olympic Games (traditionally the main championship for the sport).

A second limited event was held in 1980, and the inaugural championships in 1983, with all the events, is considered the official start of the competition. Until 1980, the Olympic champions were also considered as reigning World champions. 

At their debut, these championships were then held every four years, until 1991, when they switched to a two-year cycle.

History
The idea of having an Athletics World Championships was around well before the competition's first event in 1983. In 1913, the IAAF decided that the Olympic Games would serve as the World Championships for athletics. This was considered suitable for over 50 years until in the late 1960s the desire of many IAAF members to have their own World Championships began to grow. In 1976 at the IAAF Council Meeting in Puerto Rico an Athletics World Championships separate from the Olympic Games was approved.

Following bids from both Stuttgart, West Germany and Helsinki, Finland, the IAAF Council awarded the inaugural competition to Helsinki, to take place in 1983 and be held in the Helsinki Olympic Stadium (where the 1952 Summer Olympics had been held).

Two IAAF world championship events preceded the inaugural edition of the World Championships in Athletics in 1983. The 1976 World Championships had just one event – the men's 50 kilometres walk which was dropped from the Olympic programme for the 1976 Summer Olympics and the IAAF responded by setting up their own contest. Four years later, the 1980 World Championships contained only two newly approved women's events, (400 metres hurdles and 3000 metres), neither of which featured on the programme for the 1980 Summer Olympics.

Over the years the competition has grown in size. In 1983 1,333 athletes from 153 countries participated. By the 2003 competition, in Paris, it had grown to 1,679 athletes from 198 countries with coverage being transmitted to 179 countries.

There has also been a change in composition over the years, with several new events, all for women, being added. By 2005, the only differences were men's competition in the 50 km walk, and equivalent events in women's 100 m hurdles and heptathlon to men's 110 m hurdles and decathlon.

The following list shows when new events were added for the first time.

1987, women's 10,000 m and 10 km walk were added.
1993, women's triple jump was added.
1995, women's 3,000 m was replaced by the 5000 m.
1999, women's pole vault and hammer were added and the women's 20 km walk replaced the 10 km walk.
2005, women's 3000 m steeplechase was added.
2017, women's 50 km walk was added.
2019, mixed 4 × 400 m relay was added.
2022, men's and women's 35 km walk replaced the 50 km walk.

Championships

All-time medal table
Updated after the 2022 World Athletics Championships.

Notes
  is the name under which Russian athletes competed in the 2017 and 2019 Championships. Their medals were not included in the official medal table.

All-time placing table
In the IAAF placing table the total score is obtained from assigning eight points to the first place and so on to one point for the eight placed finalists. Points are shared in situations where a tie occurs. However, the IAAF site shows all points rounded to the nearest integer.

Updated after the 2019 Championships

Notes
 including points earned by athletes from East Germany (510 pts) and West Germany (191.5 pts) at the 1976, 1980, 1983 and 1987 Championships.
 including points earned by Authorised Neutral Athletes (103.5 pts) at the 2017 and 2019 Championships.

Multiple medalists

Men

Sixteen male athletes have won at least six medals.

Women
Twenty four female athletes have won at least six medals.

Multiple winners

Boldface denotes active athletes and highest medal count among all athletes (including these who not included in these tables) per type.

Men

All events

* including one medal in the relay event in which he participated in the heats only

Individual events

Women

All events

* including one medal in the relay event in which she participated in the heats only 
** including two medals in the relay events in which she participated in the heats only 
*** including three medals in the relay events in which she participated in the heats only 
**** including four medals in the relay events in which she participated in the heats only

Individual events

Athletes with most appearances
There are 64 athletes (35 men and 29 women) that have competed in at least eight editions.

* At the 1993 World Championships in Athletics in Stuttgart, Germany, Dragutin Topić competed as an Individual World Championship Participant (IWP) as Athletic Federation of Yugoslavia was suspended by IAAF due to United Nations sanctions stemming from the Yugoslav wars.

World records
A total of 35 world records have been set or equalled at the competition: 18 by men, 15 by women, and 2 in the mixed relay.

The first world record to be set at the World Championships was by Jarmila Kratochvílová of Czechoslovakia, who ran	47.99 seconds to win the 1983 women's 400 m final.

A peak of five world records came at the 1993 Championships. 

The most recent world record was in the Men's Pole vault in 2022, when Armand Duplantis of Sweden cleared the new record height of 6.21 metres. World records have become less common as the history of the event has expanded, with no world records set in the 1997, 2001, 2007 or 2013 editions.

American athletes have been the most successful with fourteen world records, followed by Jamaica and Great Britain on four each. Jamaican sprinter Usain Bolt has broken the most world records at the competition, at four, while American Carl Lewis set three. Jonathan Edwards holds the distinction of breaking the world record twice in one championships: improving upon his own newly-set world record in the 1995 men's triple jump final. The men's 4 × 100 metres relay has yielded the most world records, with five set between 1983 and 2011.

Ben Johnson's time of 9.83 seconds at the 1987 World Championships men's 100 m final was initially considered to be a world record, but this was rescinded in 1989 after Johnson admitted to steroid use between 1981 and 1988.

Also, the 2009 Jamaican men's 4 × 100 metres relay team time of 37.31 seconds was retrospectively recognised to as the world record after the team's time of 37.10 at the 2008 Olympics was rescinded after the disqualification of Nesta Carter (who was not present in the World Championships team).

See also
IAAF Hall of Fame
IAAF Athlete of the Year
International Athletics Championships and Games
World Para Athletics Championships
List of World Athletics Championships medalists (men)
List of World Athletics Championships medalists (women)

Notes and references

External links

Official World Athletics site for World Championships
Results of past World Championships
Track and Field Results Almanac
Top medalists from World Athletics Championships 
IAAF Statistics Book – IAAF World Championships London 2017
IAAF Statistics Book – IAAF World Athletics Championships Doha 2019

 
World Championships in Athletics
Recurring sporting events established in 1983